Terror Island is a 1920 American silent adventure film produced by Jesse Lasky and directed by James Cruze. It is a starring vehicle for illusionist Harry Houdini here costarring with Lila Lee. This film listed as 7 reels by the AFI but two reels are lost/missing with only 5 reels remaining. The film had the working title of Salvage.

Plot
Beverly West appeals to Harry Harper, the inventor of a submarine device for salvaging sunken vessels, to help her rescue her father from the South Sea natives who are holding him as a ransom for the skull shaped pearl that Beverly possesses. Also desirous of the pearl is Job Mourdant, Beverly's guardian, who kidnaps his ward and heads out to sea. Harry follows and saves Beverly when Mourdant throws her overboard.

After the two parties arrive on the island, Harry is captured but escapes in time to see the natives thrust Beverly into an iron safe and throw her into the sea. Once again, Harry saves the girl, and finally procures the gems after struggling with a man in a diving suit. Harry then so impresses the natives with his magic that they release Beverly and her father and the three set sail for home.

Cast
Harry Houdini as Harry Harper
Lila Lee as Beverly West, niece of Job Mordaunt
Jack Brammall as Ensign Tom Starkey
Wilton Taylor as Job Mordaunt
Eugene Pallette as Guy Mordaunt
Edward Brady as Captin Marsh
Frank Bonner as Chief Bakaida
Ted E. Duncan  as First Officer Murphy
Fred Turner as Mr. West
Rosemary Theby as Sheila Mourdant, Guy Mordaunt's wife

References

External links

Terror Island at afi.com

1920 films
American silent feature films
Films directed by James Cruze
Famous Players-Lasky films
1920 adventure films
American adventure films
Harry Houdini
American black-and-white films
Silent adventure films
1920s American films